This is a list of places - inhabited or otherwise - in Montserrat.

Key 
(destroyed) - destroyed in the 1995 eruption of the Soufrière Hills volcano

(inhabited) - still inhabited

(overgrown) - buildings remain but are overgrown

(uninhabited) - uninhabited as a result of the 1995 eruption, but not destroyed

A

B 

 Bethel (destroyed)
 Brades (inhabited)
 Bramble Village (destroyed)

C 

 Cudjoehead (inhabited)

D 

 Davy Hill (inhabited)

E 
 Elberton (uninhabited)

F 

 Frith (inhabited)
 Forgathy's Hill

G 

 Gages (uninhabited)
 Garibaldi Hill (uninhabited)
 Gerald's (inhabited)

H 

 Harris (overgrown)

I

J

K 

 Kinsale (destroyed)

L 

 Little Bay (inhabited)
 Long Ground (destroyed)
 Lookout (inhabited)

M 

 Manjack Heights (inhabited)

N

O 

 Old Town (inhabited)
 Olveston (inhabited)

P 

 Plymouth (destroyed)

Q

R 

 Richmond Hill (overgrown)

S 

 Salem (inhabited)
 St George's Hill (inhabited)
 St John's (inhabited)
 St Patrick's (overgrown)
 St Peter's (inhabited)

T 

 Tuitts (destroyed)

U

V 

 Virgin Islands (inhabited)

W 

 Weekes (uninhabited)
 Woodlands (inhabited)

X

Y

Z

See also 

 Little Bay
 Montserrat
 Plymouth

References 

Places
Places
Montserrat